Arnold Denny "Stilts" Risen (October 9, 1924 – August 4, 2012) was an American professional basketball player.

A 6'9" (2.06 m) center, he led the Ohio State University Buckeyes to two straight Final Four appearances. Risen had transferred to Ohio State from Eastern Kentucky State Teacher's College.

Risen played professionally in the NBA for ten seasons (1948–1958) as a member of the Rochester Royals and Boston Celtics. Risen was a four-time All-Star and two-time NBA Champion, and he scored 7,633 points in his NBA career. He was elected to the Naismith Memorial Basketball Hall of Fame in 1998, Ohio State's Varsity "O" Hall of Fame in 2004, the College Basketball Hall of Fame in 2006, and the Ohio Basketball Hall of Fame in 2008. Because he settled in Beachwood, Ohio, after his professional career, he was also inducted into the Greater Cleveland Sports Hall of Fame in 2008. .

Risen died in Beachwood on August 4, 2012 at the age of 87.

BAA/NBA career statistics

Regular season

Playoffs

References

External links

Risen's Basketball Hall of Fame page

1924 births
2012 deaths
All-American college men's basketball players
American men's basketball players
Basketball players from Kentucky
Boston Celtics players
Centers (basketball)
Eastern Kentucky Colonels men's basketball players
Indianapolis Kautskys players
Naismith Memorial Basketball Hall of Fame inductees
National Basketball Association All-Stars
National Collegiate Basketball Hall of Fame inductees
Ohio State Buckeyes men's basketball players
People from Williamstown, Kentucky
Rochester Royals players
Sportspeople from the Cincinnati metropolitan area